Durand is a village in Winnebago County, Illinois, United States. It is part of the Rockford, Illinois Metropolitan Statistical Area The population was 1,443 at the 2010 census, up from 1,081 in 2000.

History

Its township's beginnings initiated originally in a no longer existing settlement called Elton, an area South of Durand and including parts of the Pecatonica and Rock Run townships and settled in 1835 by Nelson Salisbury, Harvey Lower, and Scott Robb. They and nine other families settled the Southwest portion of modern Durand, Pecatonica, and Rock Run area.  Durand gave birth to Illinois' first tax-supported volunteer fire department.  Since its settlement, Durand has been prone to devastating fires.  Durand's early flourishings were closely linked to the development of the Racine-Mississippi Railroad later absorbed into Western Union.  The line reached Durand in 1857, en route to Freeport, paving the shift from the Elton community into modern Durand and deriving its name from the railroad's first president, H.S. Durand.  At this time, Durand saw the beginning of its prosperity which entailed the demise of the Elton settlement.

Geography 

Durand is located at  (42.433928, -89.328007). It is located 14 miles by road north of  US Route 20 on    Illinois Route 70.  Illinois Route 75 also runs south of town.

Demographics 

As of the census of 2000, there were 1,081 people, 441 households, and 288 families residing in the village. The racial makeup of the village was 97.22% White, 0.56% African American, 0.28% Native American, 0.09% Pacific Islander, 0.65% from other races, and 1.20% from two or more races. Hispanic or Latino of any race were 1.02% of the population.

There were 441 households, out of which 34.9% had children under the age of 18 living with them, 53.1% were married couples living together, 9.5% had a female householder with no husband present, and 34.5% were non-families. 32.2% of all households were made up of individuals, and 15.6% had someone living alone who was 65 years of age or older. The average household size was 2.45 and the average family size was 3.10.

In the village, the population was spread out, with 28.9% under the age of 18, 6.9% from 18 to 24, 28.8% from 25 to 44, 21.8% from 45 to 64, and 13.6% who were 65 years of age or older. The median age was 36 years. For every 100 females, there were 92.0 males. For every 100 females age 18 and over, there were 86.7 males.

The median income for a household in the village was $43,988, and the median income for a family was $51,042. Males had a median income of $41,016 versus $23,068 for females. The per capita income for the village was $19,211. About 5.5% of families and 5.6% of the population were below the poverty line, including 5.1% of those under age 18 and 8.4% of those age 65 or over.

Notable people
 Carrie Ashton Johnson (1863–1949), editor, author

References 

Villages in Illinois
Villages in Winnebago County, Illinois
Rockford metropolitan area, Illinois